Khristoforovka is a rural locality (a village) in Khokhlovskoye Rural Settlement, Permsky District, Perm Krai, Russia. The population was 22 as of 2010. There are 3 streets.

Geography 
Khristoforovka is located 40 km north of Perm (the district's administrative centre) by road. Mishurna is the nearest rural locality.

References 

Rural localities in Permsky District